Time is a 2002 studio album by South African jazz trumpeter, Hugh Masekela. The album was recorded in Johannesburg, South Africa, and released via Sony and Columbia labels.

Reception
Chris Nickson of AllMusic wrote: "From South African gospel to the slightly rougher feel of mbaqanga, and even the more contemporary kwaito (South Africa's disco-fied version of hip-hop) on 'Old People, Young Folks,' this album keeps its feet on the ground at home. About the only thing missing is that Masekela focuses more on his gritty, warm vocals, rather than his excellent trumpet playing. But he seems happy enough with that, and the sense of jubilation surrounding the disc glows peacefully."

Awards
Time won Masekela the South African Music Award in best producer (together with other producers) and best male artist nominations.

Track listing

References

External links

 

2002 albums
Hugh Masekela albums
Columbia Records albums